The Southern Leyte Provincial Board is the Sangguniang Panlalawigan (provincial legislature) of the Philippine province of Southern Leyte.

The members are elected via plurality-at-large voting: the province is divided into two legislative districts, each sending four members to the provincial board; the electorate votes for four members, with the four candidates with the highest number of votes being elected. The vice governor is the ex officio presiding officer, and only votes to break ties. The vice governor is also elected via the plurality voting system province-wide.

District apportionment

Current members

Vice Governor 
 Christopherson Yap, Liberal - Presiding Officer

District Board Members

Ex officio Board Members

List of members
An additional three ex officio members are the presidents of the provincial chapters of the Association of Barangay Captains, the Councilors' League, the Sangguniang Kabataan provincial president; the municipal and city (if applicable) presidents of the Association of Barangay Captains, Councilors' League and Sangguniang Kabataan, shall elect amongst themselves their provincial presidents which shall be their representatives at the board.

However, with the recent controversy regarding the role of the Sangguniang Kabataan and the proposed amendments to the Local Government Code, specifically the Sangguniang Kabataan provisions, the Sangguniang Kabataan provincial chapter president does not currently serve as an ex officio member of the Provincial Board.

Vice Governor

1st District

 City: Maasin
 Municipalities: Bontoc, Limasawa, Macrohon, Malitbog, Padre Burgos, Tomas Oppus
 Population (2015): 197,392

Died in office, July 21, 2014.
Replaced her late grandmother; appointed on 11 March 2015, took oath of office on 30 March 2015.

2nd District

 City: none
 Municipalities: Anahawan, Hinunangan, Hinundayan, Libagon, Liloan, Pintuyan, Saint Bernard, San Francisco, San Juan, San Ricardo, Silago, Sogod
 Population (2015): 224,358

Ex officio members

Philippine Councilors' League Provincial Federation

League of Barangays of the Philippines Provincial Federation

Replaced Mercado as LnBP Provincial President when Mercado was elected Mayor of Maasin, Southern Leyte in 2016.

Sangguniang Kabataan Provincial Federation

See also
 Southern Leyte
 Legislative district of Southern Leyte

References

External links
 Official Website of the Province of Southern Leyte

Provincial boards in the Philippines
Politics of Southern Leyte